Nemška Vas may refer to several places in Slovenia: 

 Nemška Vas, Krško, a village in the Municipality of Krško
 Nemška Vas, Ribnica, a village in the Municipality of Ribnica
 Nemška Vas na Blokah, a village in the Municipality of Bloke
 Slovenska Vas, Pivka, a village in the Municipality of Pivka (known as Nemška Vas until 1955)